Cesare Lapini (1848 – after 1890) was an Italian sculptor, mainly active in Florence.

Lapini sculpted both small marbles and larger works. Many of his subjects were female. Among his works is Sorpresa, a young woman surprised while disrobing; Il primo bacio; Quanto ti voglio bene;Non lo credo; Fior del pensiero; La serenata ; and Amore del mare.

References

1848 births
1890s deaths 
Year of death missing
Sculptors from Florence
19th-century Italian sculptors
Italian male sculptors
19th-century Italian male artists